Matt Kish (born June 4, 1969 in Oberlin, Ohio) is an American artist and illustrator. He is best known for his monograph Moby-Dick in Pictures: One Drawing for Every Page, an illustrated edition of Moby Dick that features one illustration for every page of Herman Melville's novel. He is also known for his illustrated edition of Joseph Conrad's Heart of Darkness.

Kish also created the virtual set design for San Francisco's Opera Parallèle's 2015 production of Tarik O'Regan's and Tom Phillips' opera Heart of Darkness, as well as UC Santa Cruz's 2015 production  and Opera Parallèle's 2017 production  of Rachel Portman's opera The Little Prince.

In 2016, Kish's Moby-Dick art was featured as part of "Matt Kish & Robert Del Tredici: Chasing the Whale and Other Endless Pursuits," a temporary exhibit at the Contemporary Arts Center in Cincinnati. Following the exhibit, the Newberry Library in Chicago acquired 81 of Kish's pieces to be included in their "Moby-Dick: Extracts" permanent collection.

Style

Every page of Moby Dick
Every Page of Moby-Dick, Illustrated is composed of 552 illustrations, produced in a span of 543 days between 2009 and 2011. Every illustration is accompanied by a selected quote from the corresponding page of the Signet Classics paperback edition of the novel. Inspired by Zak Smith’s “Pictures Showing What Happens on Each Page of Thomas Pynchon's Novel Gravity's Rainbow” (2006), Kish decided to devote his efforts to the representation on paper of both active components of his reading process, the visual and imaginative. As far as the core materials he used are concerned, he forced and allowed himself to “explore as many wildly varying types of media and materials” as he could conceive of, from ballpoint pen to stickers, to collage, to spray-paint, to crayon, to charcoal, to acrylic paint with the aim of giving shape to a graphically unique approach to Melville’s masterpiece. He would very loosely sketch a piece on very thick heavy watercolor paper, and then layer in lots of color over which he would eventually go back, to define the illustration. No digital effects were used on the pieces, except for some adjustments after scanning them so that the digital image would more closely resemble the original. Kish drew his illustrations on found paper, the content of which ranges from old radio schematics, to old chemistry books from the 50s, to nautical books, from maps, to tossed out copies of Moby-Dick itself. As the illustrator reached the final stages of his work, he gradually stopped using the found paper, opting instead for plain white watercolor paper or Bristol board for quite a few of the final illustrations - because as the terrifying climax looms, the scope of the novel narrows until the only thing that matters is the Whale”. In contrast, at the beginning, with the entire novel ahead  of him, he worked on the exploration and on the exposition of those layers of meaning and symbolism, justifying his choice by saying that it was best done through layering the paint and the ink over the found pages to see what sorts of strange juxtapositions and hidden illuminations that would create. In particular the presence of found paper gave physicality to the co- existence of the literal and symbolic interpretation of the novel. In order to achieve such a goal, he adopted any kind of style of representation, which suggested itself to him, freely choosing between realistic and abstract depictions of subjects and objects, carefully selecting the found paper that would fit his purpose.

Publications

Monographs
Moby-Dick in Pictures: One Drawing for Every Page, Tin House Books, 2011

Illustrations
The Woman Who Lived Amongst the Cannibals by Robert Kloss, self-published, 2017 
Il mediatore interlinguistico ed interculturale e il facilitatore linguistico: Natura e competenze edited by Annalisa Brichese and Valeria Tonioli, Marsilio, 2017 (cover art) 
Gravity Changes by Zach Powers, BOA Editions, 2017 (cover art)
The Revelator: A Novel by Robert Kloss, Unnamed Press, 2015
The Desert Places by Amber Sparks and Robert Kloss, Curbside Splendor, 2013
The Graphic Canon, Vol. 3: From Heart of Darkness to Hemingway to Infinite Jest edited by Russ Kick, Seven Stories Press, 2013 (contributor)
Heart of Darkness by Joseph Conrad, Tin House Books, 2013
The Alligators of Abraham by Robert Kloss, Mud Luscious Press, 2012

References

External links
Artist's Website
Book trailer for Moby-Dick in Pictures: One Drawing for Every Page
Heart of Darkness | Opera Parallèle – San Francisco Contemporary Opera

American illustrators
Artists from Ohio
Scenic designers
1969 births
Living people
People from Oberlin, Ohio